Vallarta Supermarkets Inc. is an American supermarket chain. It is based in Sylmar, Los Angeles, California, and as of October 2015 had 50 locations in California. The chain caters to the Latino communities of California and sells items usually not found in more Anglo-oriented American supermarkets. The chain has stores primarily in southern California, but has recently expanded northward with twenty one sites in Fresno. 
three sites in Lancaster CA and four sites in Palmdale CA 

Vallarta Supermarkets was founded in 1985 by Mexican émigré Enrique Gonzalez.

They are known for having Mexican themed stores.

References

External links

Supermarkets of the United States
Companies based in Los Angeles County, California
American companies established in 1985
Retail companies established in 1985